Sun Weiben (19 November 1928 – 18 December 2020) was a Chinese politician who served as Communist Party Secretary of Heilongjiang from 1985 to 1994 and Chairman of the Standing Committee of the Heilongjiang People's Congress from 1988 to 1998. He spent most of his career in northeast China's Liaoning province before becoming top leader of neighboring Heilongjiang province. He was a member of the 12th, 13th and 14th Central Committee of the Chinese Communist Party. He was a delegate to the 5th, 6th, 7th, 8th, 9th, 10th and 11th National People's Congress. He was a deputy to the 18th and 19th National Congress of the Chinese Communist Party.

Biography
Sun was born in Gaizhou, Liaoning, on November 19, 1928. He joined the Chinese Communist Party in October 1947. 

Before entering politics in March 1951, he was an accountant. He spent ten years in the Organization Department of CCP Shenyang Municipal Committee. He was Communist Party Secretary of Xifeng County in January 1961, and held that office until July 1965. Then he was appointed Communist Party Secretary of Kaiyuan County, but having held the position for only twenty months. In March 1967, at the dawn of the Cultural Revolution, he suffered political persecution and was sent to the May Seventh Cadre School to do farm works. In May 1970, he was appointed Deputy Communist Party Secretary of Faku County, a position he held until April 1974. Then he became Communist Party Secretary of Xifeng County again. He became Communist Party Secretary of Tieling in February 1976, and served until March 1982. He became a member of the Standing Committee of the CCP Liaoning Provincial Committee and rose to become Communist Party Secretary of Liaoning (deputy leader) in March 1982. 

In the autumn of 1985, he was transferred from his job in Liaoning province to neighboring Heilongjiang province. He was promoted to be Communist Party Secretary of Heilongjiang in October 1985, concurrently holding the Chairman of the Standing Committee of the Heilongjiang People's Congress position since January 1988.

On December 18, 2020, he died of illness in Harbin, Heilongjiang, aged 92.

References

1928 births
2020 deaths
People from Gaizhou
People's Republic of China politicians from Liaoning
Chinese Communist Party politicians from Liaoning
Members of the 12th Central Committee of the Chinese Communist Party
Members of the 13th Central Committee of the Chinese Communist Party
Members of the 14th Central Committee of the Chinese Communist Party
Delegates to the 5th National People's Congress
Delegates to the 6th National People's Congress
Delegates to the 7th National People's Congress
Delegates to the 8th National People's Congress
Delegates to the 9th National People's Congress
Delegates to the 10th National People's Congress
Delegates to the 11th National People's Congress
CCP committee secretaries of Heilongjiang